Volpert (or Vol'pert) is a surname. Notable people with the surname include:

Aizik Isaakovich Vol'pert,  a Soviet and Israeli mathematician.
Larissa Volpert, Larisa Ilinichna Volpert, a Russian chess Woman Grandmaster. 
Liliane Chapiro-Volpert (1902–1982), known as Lilian Constantini, French actress in the 1920s and 1930s.